TeenNick is an American pay-TV channel that is operated by the Paramount Media Networks division of Paramount Global. Aimed primarily at teens and tweens, its programming includes a variety of live-action series inherited from sister channel Nickelodeon.
The channel launched on September 28, 2009, as the merger between two defunct programming blocks which also targeted a teenage audience: TEENick on Nickelodeon and The N on Noggin. Before its introduction as a channel, TeenNick's space used to be held by Nick GAS (from 1999 to 2007) and a short-lived, 24-hour version of The N (from 2007 to 2009).

When the TeenNick channel was first announced in early 2009, its name was spelled "TEENick" like the block it was based on.

Nick Cannon, the original host of the TEENick block on Nickelodeon, was described in publicity materials as the chairman of TeenNick as well as its programming consultant. Cannon also hosted several shows on the channel, including TeenNick Top 10.

As of September 2018, TeenNick is available to approximately 63.314 million pay-TV households in the United States.

History

As programming blocks (2001–2009) 
TeenNick is the successor to TEENick and The N, two programming blocks that aired on Nickelodeon and Noggin, respectively.

TEENick was a celebrity-hosted programming block on Nickelodeon aimed at tweens. The block launched on March 4, 2001, and lasted until February 1, 2009. TEENick aired on Sunday nights from 6 to 9p.m. ET/PT. In 2005, it was rebroadcast on Saturday from 8 to 10p.m. ET/PT (replacing the popular SNICK block that started in 1992). Saturday night editions were broadcast as "TEENick Saturday Night" until 2006 where it rebranded as "TEENick" for both broadcasts. The inaugural host was Nick Cannon, followed by Jason Everhart (a.k.a. "J. Boogie"). TEENick's programming mainly consisted of live-action comedies, such as True Jackson, VP, The Troop, and iCarly, as well as occasional reruns of animated shows such as All Grown Up! and My Life as a Teenage Robot.

Meanwhile, The N was a nighttime block on Noggin that launched on April 1, 2002, running from 6:00 p.m. to 6:00 a.m. ET every day. Series that previously aired during Noggin's time as an all-ages channel — like A Walk in Your Shoes and Sponk! — migrated to The N. The block spawned several original series, including the animated comedy O'Grady and the live-action dramas Out There and South of Nowhere. The N was also the U.S. broadcast home of Canada's Degrassi: The Next Generation. Like the rest of the Noggin channel, The N's original shows were created with educational goals, which was uncommon for teen programming at the time.

On August 13, 2007, Nickelodeon announced that it would shut down Nick GAS at the end of the year, with a 24-hour version of The N taking over its channel space. The N's standalone network ran for less than two years, from December 31, 2007, to September 28, 2009. Upon gaining its own channel, The N incorporated several TEENick series into its lineup, including Drake & Josh, Ned's Declassified School Survival Guide, and Zoey 101. According to Polygon, "Nickelodeon began phasing out The N's programming and replacing it with TEENick, an entertainment block with no educational curriculum and zero involvement from Noggin. The N lost its footing by 2009, and both [The N] and its website closed down completely."

TeenNick channel (2009–present) 
The TeenNick channel debuted on September 28, 2009, at 6a.m. ET, accompanied by the debut of a new logo, designed by New York-based creative director/designer Eric Zim. Nick Cannon, who was the original host of the TEENick block itself, was declared in publicity materials as the "Chairman of TeenNick." Cannon had a major presence on the channel, appearing in network promotions, continuing to be associated in some way with the network until the cancellation of the TeenNick Top 10 in 2018. Several shows from TEENick and The N's program libraries were carried over to the TeenNick channel, though the majority of the programming came from TEENick's library rather than The N's.

On February 1, 2010, TeenNick began incorporating music videos into its morning and afternoon schedule on a regular basis, airing between certain programs – and effectively reducing commercial breaks within programs where a music video is to be aired afterward from 6a.m. to 3p.m. ET (this had been done periodically for some time before that date, usually airing between 6 and 8a.m. ET, although not every day), same thing as Nickelodeon did with programs such as iCarly, Big Time Rush, Victorious, and How to Rock.
In July 2011, TeenNick began carrying programs originally filmed for high-definition broadcast in a letterboxed format, due to the absence of an HD simulcast feed of the channel. After Nicktoons and Nick Jr. launched HD services in 2013, TeenNick was the only Nickelodeon-branded network without an HD simulcast network until September 2016; this remains limited to IPTV providers and some cable company mobile and digital media player apps, such as that of the companies under the Spectrum branding.

Nighttime programming block 

From 2011 to 2022, the TeenNick channel had aired a "retro" programming block dedicated to reruns of classic Nickelodeon series. It was inspired by a large amount of interest in Nickelodeon's past programs on social media outlets. The block was originally known as "The '90s Are All That," in reference to the sketch comedy series All That that was a fixture on Nickelodeon throughout the 1990s and 2000s. To align itself with Nickelodeon's cross-platform branding, the block was renamed three times: to "The Splat" on October 5, 2015; to "NickSplat" on May 1, 2017; and to its final name "NickRewind" on March 18, 2019. Rewind was dicontinued on January 31, 2022, returning the channel to a 24-hour regular channel. As of 2023, there is no dedicated programming blocks.

Programming 

As of 2019, reruns of Nickelodeon-produced series and specials, feature films, and acquired programs all broadcast in multi-hour blocks serve as the main programming on the network.

Programming history 

In the first few years following its launch in 2009, TeenNick had somewhat lightened programming content standards than the rest of the Nickelodeon channels. In addition to reruns of the TEENick block's family-targeted shows, the TeenNick channel picked up several foreign shows with more mature content (e.g. profanity or suggestive dialogue), like Open Heart. Following a rebranding in summer 2015, the channel dropped most of the other programming to almost exclusively air reruns of Nickelodeon's original series. By 2019, TeenNick de facto shared the same content standards as other Nickelodeon networks. This year also marked another rebranding, which saw the network billed as "Viacom's tween-oriented cable network" instead of a network for teenagers.

Many programs that had aired on TEENick, and several programs that had aired on The N, were carried over to TeenNick. These were mixed with some syndicated shows from other networks. On April 20, 2011, TeenNick announced that it had acquired the rights to air Buffy the Vampire Slayer starting in May, though this was short-lived and it returned to FX (and later, Pivot) within a matter of months.

TeenNick produced few original shows. The first original series produced under the TeenNick name, the half-hour teen drama Gigantic, ran from October 2010 to April 22, 2011. The last original program exclusive to TeenNick, the music video countdown show TeenNick Top 10, was cancelled in 2018, commiserate with Viacom's new 'six prime networks' strategy effectively cutting out all but Nickelodeon and Nick Jr. from airing original children's series on their network spaces. First-run episodes of series airing on TeenNick since then have been primarily in the form of Nickelodeon series that are burned off due to low ratings on the flagship channel, such as, in the recent past; Hollywood Heights, House of Anubis,  Bucket & Skinner's Epic Adventures, and Star Falls. Also, Alien Dawn, and foreign shows from international Nickelodeon networks which receive a minimum US run to fulfill contracts, such as Life with Boys, Dance Academy, H2O: Just Add Water, and Alien Surf Girls. As TeenNick has a high definition feed with very limited distribution, and is nearly exclusive to higher-cost digital cable tiers, ratings for those shows traditionally have a drastic fall with a move to TeenNick, alongside the network producing few promotions referring the transplanted programming.

On July 15, 2019, the network began to broadcast in primetime a mixture of content from MTV, including repeats of Teen Wolf and My Super Sweet 16, and series which originated as YouTube Originals from recent Viacom acquisition AwesomenessTV (a company founded by Nickelodeon president Brian Robbins and frequent co-collaborator Joe Davola). Season three of Hunter Street (which airs on weeknights over a month), initially meant for Nickelodeon, began to air on the channel on July 29, 2019. By the winter of 2019, regular Nickelodeon repeats had returned to the primetime lineup.

Nick Cannon's on-air presence as the chairman of the network decreased after TeenNick Top 10 stopped airing in March 2018. This was the last series produced by Cannon's company, NCredible Entertainment, for the network. In July 2020, Cannon was fired from all roles at ViacomCBS due to anti-Semitic statements, though later returned after making several apologies and amends for his behavior.

NickRewind 

NickRewind was TeenNick's late-night programming block dedicated to Nickelodeon's most popular programs, mainly from the 1990s. Originally launched on July 25, 2011, as The '90s Are All That, NickRewind operated in much the similar way as Nick at Nite, which serves as a separate identity for the overnight programming on Nickelodeon, though NickRewind was not considered its own network in Nielsen ratings due to targeting the same demographic as TeenNick. After relaunching as The Splat in 2015, the block expanded to include programming from the 1980s to early-mid 2000s. The block was discontinued on January 31, 2022.

International versions

Current 
 France – launched on November 19, 2014, as Nickelodeon 4Teen, rebranded as Nickelodeon Teen on August 26, 2017.
 Latin America – launched on September 14, 2020, replacing the former Nick HD feed known as Nick 2.
 Middle East & North Africa – launched on April 15, 2017.
 Greece - available as a programming block on Rise TV.
 Israel - launched on March 20, 2017.
 Vietnam - a TeenNick block was launched on HTV3 on September 28, 2018.
 Hungary -  launched on January 12, 2021, replacing RTL Spike.
 Romania - launched on January 12, 2021, replacing Paramount Channel.
 Czech Republic launches September 2021 as a TV channel.
 Poland launches 1 September 2021 as a TV channel.
 Brazil - a TeenNick was launched on Pluto TV on September 21, 2021.
 Germany, Austria, and Switzerland - In May 2020, Pluto TV launched international feeds in these countries.

Defunct 
 UK & Ireland – Launched on 2009 as a programming block on Nickelodeon. Ended July 30, 2010.
 Netherlands and Flanders  – launched on February 14, 2011, as a programming block on Nickelodeon. Closed down on September 30, 2015 and replaced by Spike, now Paramount Network.
 India - launched on November 21, 2012, as a programming block on Nick Jr. Ended on February 1, 2017.
 Italy – launched on December 4, 2015. Closed down on May 2, 2020.

References

External links 
 

Television networks in the United States
English-language television stations in the United States
Nickelodeon
Television channels and stations established in 2002
Children's television networks in the United States
Television channels and stations established in 2009